Uneasy Terms is a 1946 crime thriller novel by the British writer Peter Cheyney. It was the seventh and last in his series featuring the London-based private detective Slim Callaghan, a British version of the hardboiled heroes of American writing.

Synopsis
Callaghan encounter a case in a small country village near Alfriston where a wealthy woman may have been killed by any one of her three attractive daughters, furious about the terms of the new will she was drafting.

Film adaptation
In 1948 it was made into a British film of the same title directed by Vernon Sewell and starring Michael Rennie, Moira Lister and Joy Shelton.

References

Bibliography
 Goble, Alan. The Complete Index to Literary Sources in Film. Walter de Gruyter, 1999.
 Magill, Frank Northen. Critical Survey of Mystery and Detective Fiction: Authors, Volume 1. Salem Press, 1988.
 Reilly, John M. Twentieth Century Crime & Mystery Writers. Springer, 2015.
 Server, Lee. Encyclopedia of Pulp Fiction Writers. Infobase Publishing, 2014.

1946 British novels
Novels by Peter Cheyney
British thriller novels
Novels set in Sussex
Novels set in London
British crime novels
British novels adapted into films
William Collins, Sons books